No More Kings is the debut album by Los Angeles rock band No More Kings. It was released March 6, 2007.

The album has produced two singles, "Michael (Jump In)", and the band's biggest hit "Sweep The Leg" that gained much praise for the accompanying music video, which featured many of the stars of the movie The Karate Kid.  The video was directed by William Zabka who played Johnny Lawrence in the movie.

In early 2008, the album won in The 7th Annual Independent Music Awards for Best Punk Album.

Track listing
"Zombie Me"  – 3:29
"Sweep The Leg"  – 3:17
"Michael (Jump In)"  – 3:11
"Someday"  – 2:57
"Grand Experiment"  – 3:53
"Girl In The Sea"  – 3:56
"Leaving Lilliput"  – 4:19
"About Schroeder"  – 1:58
"God Breathed"  – 3:49
"Mr. B"  – 3:21
"Old Man Walking"  – 1:56
"Umbrella"  – 4:31
"This"  – 4:14

Miscellaneous
 Front Man Pete Mitchell has called this album a "Thank you to the 80's"
 The record contains several references to various pop culture items.  Subjects include The Karate Kid, Peanuts comic strip, Knight Rider, and Gulliver's Travels.
 The song Sweep The Leg was featured in the game MLB 08: The Show, and subsequently on the May edition of GameStop TV.

References

External links

2007 debut albums
No More Kings albums